Arsen Harutyunyan may refer to:
 Arsen Harutyunyan (alpine skier)
 Arsen Harutyunyan (wrestler)